The British Columbia Public Interest Advocacy Centre (BCPIAC) is a non-profit, public interest law office. It legally assists people in natural resources management, human rights and poverty, and consumer issues.

History
BCPIAC was founded in 1981 to provide representation to groups that would not otherwise have the resources to effectively assert their interests.  The missions of BCPIAC is to advocate the interests of residential consumers, and in particular low-income groups, in the regulation and deregulation of services, and the interests of disadvantaged groups in obtaining access to justice and equality before the law.

Funding
BCPIAC relies on the financial support of the Law Foundation of BC.

See also
 Public Interest

References

External links
 BCPIAC

Legal organizations based in British Columbia
Non-profit organizations based in Vancouver
Legal advocacy organizations based in Canada
Organizations established in 1981
1981 establishments in Canada